Beisfjord is a village in Narvik Municipality in Nordland county, Norway. The village sits in a valley surrounded by steep mountains, with the Lakselva river flowing through it and emptying into the fjord. The  village has a population (2021) of 828.

History
Beisfjord was the location of one of the most notorious concentration camps during World War II in Norway.  It was called "Lager 1 Beisfjord" (meaning Camp #1 Beisfjord).  This was a concentration camp for Yugoslav (mostly Serb) prisoners of war, and later for Soviet POWs .  The Yugoslavians consisted of about 900 men, 88 of whom were between 14 and 18 years of age.  They were housed there for about six months, until the survivors were transferred out in October 1942.

During one three-week period in July 1942, 311 men died, some from typhus, but most on one day when the German high command ordered all 287 prisoners in the sick quarters to be executed, citing concerns over health risks. All but about 100 were marched to a prepared mass grave and shot (this was known as the Beisfjord massacre).  Those who were not yet dead were buried alive.  When the remaining 100 prisoners refused to leave the barracks, the Germans doused the place with gasoline and set it on fire. Those who did not burn to death were shot as they tried to escape. In all, during the six-month stay in Beisfjord, about 83% (>700 prisoners) of the Yugoslavians died.

After the remaining Yugoslavians were transferred out in October 1942, Russian prisoners were brought to Beisfjord and kept there until 1945. In all, 3,500–4,000 Russians had passed through the camp by the war's end.

References

Narvik
Villages in Nordland
Populated places of Arctic Norway
Nazi concentration camps in Norway